Gerhardt Otto Dornhoefer (born February 2, 1943), better known as Gary Dornhoefer, is a Canadian former professional ice hockey right winger who played 14 seasons in the National Hockey League (NHL) for the Boston Bruins and Philadelphia Flyers. He was a member of the Flyers' back-to-back Stanley Cup championship teams in 1974 and 1975.

Playing career
After playing his junior hockey with the Niagara Falls Flyers of the Ontario Hockey Association, Dornhoefer made his NHL debut with the Boston Bruins in the 1964 season, playing in 32 games, scoring twelve goals and ten assists. After that promising start, he played poorly to start the next season and was little used by Boston thereafter, spending most of the next three seasons in the minor leagues, principally with the Hershey Bears of the American Hockey League.

Philadelphia Flyers
Dornhoefer was left unprotected in the 1967 NHL Expansion Draft. The Philadelphia Flyers selected him with the 13th pick overall, and he would never play with another team.

In that first year with Philadelphia, Dornhoefer scored 13 goals and 43 points while accumulating 134 penalty minutes and gaining a reputation as a hard hitting, grinding left winger with a touch for scoring. Two seasons later he reached the 20-goal plateau for the first time, a mark he would achieve in five seasons.  In 1973 he had his best season, scoring 30 goals and 49 assists for 79 points and being named to play in the All-Star Game. The most famous play of his career came in the 1973 Stanley Cup playoffs when he scored a crucial overtime goal against the Minnesota North Stars on a solo rush. The goal was memorialized on a statue at the Spectrum, which was demolished in 2010-11.  The statue now sits outside Xfinity Live in the middle of the South Philadelphia Sports Complex. 

Although hampered by injuries throughout his career in consequence of his bruising style, Dornhoefer remained an effective scorer through his penultimate season, and was named to play in the All-Star Game again in 1977, and finished that regular season with a +47 plus/minus mark.  The season thereafter, missing nearly half the season through injury, his scoring touch disappeared completely, and he retired after the 1978 playoffs.

Dornhoefer played in 787 games over 14 seasons, scoring 214 goals and 328 assists for 542 points, adding 1291 penalty minutes.  At the time of his retirement he was second only to Bobby Clarke as the team's all-time leading scorer, and still ranks tenth in that category.  His eleven seasons with Philadelphia are surpassed only by Clarke, Bill Barber and Rick MacLeish, and on a team iconic for its brawling ways, Dornhoefer is eighth in franchise penalty minutes.

Post-playing career
After his retirement following the 1977–1978 season, Dornhoefer moved to broadcasting. He worked a short time in Philadelphia locally, then moved back to his native Ontario, Canada to work on Hockey Night In Canada as a color commentator from 1978–1987. After a six-year hiatus from broadcasting, Dornhoefer moved back to Philadelphia in 1992 and joined the Flyers broadcast team, originally working with play-by-play man Gene Hart. He served as a Flyers' color analyst through the 2005–06 NHL season. Dornhoefer became a citizen of the United States of America on March 16, 2016.

Career statistics

Regular season and playoffs

References

External links
 
Meltzer, Bill Philadelphia Flyers Heroes of the Past: Gary Dornhoefer at PhiladelphiaFlyers.com

1943 births
Living people
Boston Bruins players
Canadian colour commentators
Canadian ice hockey right wingers
Canadian sports announcers
Canadian people of German descent
Hershey Bears players
Ice hockey people from Ontario
Sportspeople from Kitchener, Ontario
Minneapolis Bruins players
National Hockey League All-Stars
National Hockey League broadcasters
Niagara Falls Flyers (1960–1972) players
Philadelphia Flyers announcers
Philadelphia Flyers players
San Francisco Seals (ice hockey) players
Stanley Cup champions
Canadian expatriate ice hockey players in the United States